is a Japanese manga artist. His works include military comics such as Panzergrenadier (装甲擲弾兵), Warrior in Flames -Jochen Peiper (炎の騎士　ヨーヘン・パイパー戦記) & Unternehmen Blau (ブラウ作戦).

Works
Works about World War II:
The Black Knight Story  (黒騎士物語), 1985
Panzer Vor!  (パンツァーフォー！), 1986
Panzergrenadier  (装甲擲弾兵), 1987
Panzer Krieg  (パンツァークリーク), 1988
Death of the Steel  (鋼鉄の死神), 1989 - The biography of Michael Wittmann.
Warrior in Flames - Jochen Peiper  (炎の騎士　ヨーヘン・パイパー戦記), 1990 - The biography of Jochen Peiper.
Kampfgruppe Zbv  (カンプグルッペZbv), 1993
Happy Tiger  (ハッピータイガー), 1993
Japanisch Frw. Bataillon der Waffen SS  (東亜総統特務隊), 1995. - 'Japanese foreign legion of the Waffen-SS.'  It's a comedy.
Unternehmen Barbarossa  (バルバロッサ作戦), 2001. - Operation Barbarossa
Unternehmen Taifun  (タイフーン作戦), 2002. - Operation Typhoon
Unternehmen Blau  (ブラウ作戦), 2003. - Operation Blue
Unternehmen Zitadelle  (ツィタデル作戦), 2005. - Operation Zitadelle
Deutschland Afrika Korps  (アフリカ軍団), 2006. - Afrika Korps and the biography of Erwin Rommel.
Samland 1945  (ザームラント1945), 2007. - Battle of Sambia.

Works about the Vietnam War:
Cat Shit One (キャットシットワン), 1998
Vietnam War  (ヴェトナムウォー), 1999

Alternate history:
World War III  (第3次世界大戦), 1988
Battle over Hokkaidō  (バトルオーバー北海道), 1989 - Set in 1995, Soviet hardliners assassinate Mikhail Gorbachev and launch a war against NATO and Japan. In the Far East, the Soviet military fights the JSDF in a battle over control of Hokkaidō.
Raid on Tokyo/Tokyo Wars  (トウキョウウォーズ), 1991 - This is a story of the JSDF fighting against the Soviet Army in Tokyo and Niigata.
Korean War II  (第2次朝鮮戦争 ユギオII), 1996
Samurai Soldier  (サムライ・ソルジャー), 1999
Omega 7  (オメガ7), 2002
Omega J  (オメガJ), 2003

Science Fiction:
Gatse  (ワンマン・アーミー　ゲイツ), 1987
The Time Troopers  (タイム・トルーパー), 1989
HYDT  (士官候補生ハイト), 1989

American comic books:
Psychonauts (with writer Alan Grant, 4-issue mini series, Epic Comics, 1993–1994)

Video games:
Accele Brid (Character Designer)

References

Motofumi Kobayashi at Lambiek's Comiclopedia

External links
 

Living people
1951 births
Manga artists from Fukuoka Prefecture
Japan Self-Defense Forces in fiction